Kkoli: A Journey of Love is a 2014 Bengali romantic-drama film directed by Partha Chakraborty and produced by Rakesh Singh under the banner of Vignesh Films. The film marks the debut of Heerak and Ruplekha, the male and female lead respectively. Film score was given by Meet Bros Anjjan and Surojit Chatterjee.

Cast 
 Heerak
 Ruplekha
 Kharaj Mukherjee
 Rajesh Sharma
 Chandan Sen
 Locket Chatterjee
 Tulika Basu

Music 

The soundtrack of the film has been given by Meet Bros Anjjan and Surojit Chatterjee, while the lyrics have been penned by Rana Mazumdar and Surojit Chatterjee. The album includes four original tracks, one reprise track and one remix track. This album marks the Tollywood debut of the trio, Meet Bros Anjjan.

References

External links 
 Kkoli: A Journey of Love at Moviebuff
 Kkoli: A Journey of Love at Induna

Bengali-language Indian films
2010s Bengali-language films
2014 films
Indian romantic drama films
Films scored by Meet Bros Anjjan
Films scored by Surojit Cahtterjee